Pengangkutan Awam Putrajaya Travel & Tours Sdn Bhd dba Nadi Putra is the city bus operator in Putrajaya, the administrative capital of Malaysia, mainly serving Putrajaya city and nearby resident areas. Originally established as an agency of Putrajaya Corporation under the Ministry of Federal Territories, it was privatised in 2018.

Nadi Putra is now operated by RapidKL, the largest city bus operator in Selangor and Kuala Lumpur.

History 

Established on 20 May 1999 with 14 routes covering almost all of the areas inside Putrajaya, Nadi Putra is the trade name of Putrajaya intra-city bus services and has been in operation since July 1999. The bus service was privatised and handed over to GETS Global Berhad in 2018.

Cashless payment was implemented in January 2018, using Kad Putra; the cards were discontinued two years later in favour of QR code payment.

All Nadi Putra bus services will be free of charge for Malaysian citizens effective 1 November 2020. Some new routes were also being planned at that time, under the Perikatan Nasional government. However, use of the Nadi Putra app is still mandatory for contact tracing and citizenship verification.

From 1st January 2023, Perbadanan Putrajaya revamped the Nadi Putra bus routes in Putrajaya, with the operations transferred to Rapid Bus (RapidKL's primary bus network). All routes, except P101 route are no longer free of charge, with payment of RM1 per journey using Touch n' Go cards.

Fleet

Originally, Nadi Putra's fleet consisted of several numbers of Optare Metrorider, MAN SL 252 and Hino RK1J buses, however, in 2006, it was replaced with Badanbas-bodied South Korean Daewoo BV120MA NGV buses. The fleet then expanded to 176 buses in 2009 with the additional fleet and the introduction of the shorter Daewoo BS106 buses for routes with sharper corners. Majority of this fleet has been retired in 2019 due to high maintenance cost, however 8 BV120MA's has revived to improve frequencies.

In 2015, a collaboration between Perbadanan Putrajaya and Japan's New Energy and Industrial Technology Development Organization (NEDO) was made to aim for green public transportation by 2025, which led to the introduction of 5 prototype electric supercapacitor buses, jointly built by Scania, Deftech and Toshiba. Nicknamed NEDO-EV buses, these buses can run up to 30 kilometres on a single 10-minute charge. This bus entered service in 2018, but it has been suspended in 2020 due to internal problems, and expereadinesstion to re-enter service is yetbe  to determined.

With Rapid Bus becoming the new bus operator in Nadi Putra from January 2023, the revamped bus routes will use the Alexander Dennis Enviro200 bus fleet owned by Rapid Bus. The Foton buses were returned to Konsortium Bas Ekspres Semenanjung (KBES), while the Daewoo NGV buses were retired and abandoned.

Criticism

Nadi Putra's service quality has reportedly declined since privatisation in 2018. Most of the buses are poorly maintained frequencies are breaking down, causing outrage among the residents and workers in Putrajaya, Cyberjaya and Bandar Saujana Putra.

Strikes broke out among Nadi Putra bus drivers in 2007 and 2018 due to shortage of buses available inforervice.

The implementation of cashless payment via Kad Putra instead of the more widely accepted Touch 'n Go in January 2018 led to outcry from commuters coming from outside Putrajaya, as the cards and reloading services were only available at the Putrajaya/Cyberjaya ERL station, the station being Nadi Putra's hub. The cards were abolished in January 2020, and were replaced by QR code mobile applications.

The result of poorly maintained NGV buses was that the bus was abandoned and replaced by Foton BJ6108U7LHD-R coach buses from Konsortium Bas Ekspres Semenanjung (KBES), which was unpractical for city-buses, thus led to a failure of having sustainable city buses. This also led to some of the routes being terminated, or transferred to another companies.

Services
This is the list of active Nadi Putra routes as of 1 January 2023.

Revamped Routes (P) 

The new routes were revamped by Perbadanan Putrajaya, and begin operation from 1 January 2023, 6.30am to 8.00pm daily. All routes except for P101 are capped at RM1 per journey.

Direct Routes 
From 13 February 2023, a new direct bus route were introduced for residents in Presint 11 working at government areas in Presint 2, 3 and 4. This bus service operates during peak hours (6.45am, 7.45am, 5.10pm &and 6.10 p.m.m) on weekdays only.

Upcoming Routes

Former Routes 

These are the former routes from the original Nadi Putra bus operator (Pengangkutan Awam Putrajaya Travel & Tours Sdn Bhd). The fare for non-citizsen is RM1.50 per journey.

Local Routes (L) 
All routes starts from Putrajaya Sentral.

Direct routes (D) 

These routes usually intended for government employees staying at nearby residential areas while working at government areas, provide direct services to residential areas. Similar to BET services in Klang Valley, this service operates during rush hours, weekdays only. Odd route numbers start from the starting point and operate in the morning rush hour, even route numbers start from Kompleks ABCDE or Dataran Gemilang in the evening rush hour.

Inactive routes 
This is the list of discontinued bus routes from the original Nadi Putra bus operator due to bus shortage or low demand.

School routes (terminated) 
Operating hours start from 6.30am to 4.00pm

Morning 
 SK Putrajaya Presint 11(1) - Putra Damai - SK Putrajaya Presint 11(1) - Putrajaya Sentral
 SK Putrajaya Presint 11(1) - P10 - SK Putrajaya Presint 11(1) - Putrajaya Sentral
 SK Putrajaya Presint 11(1) - Putra Damai

Afternoon 
 SK Putrajaya Presint 11(1) - P8 - P9
 SK Putrajaya Presint 8(1) - P8 - P9
 P&R P14 - SK Putrajaya Presint 11(2)

Fridays
 SK Putrajaya Presint 11(2) - Masjid P11A

See also
 Prasarana Malaysia Berhad
 Rapid Bus Sdn Bhd
 Rapid KL
  BRT Sunway Line
  BRT Federal Line
 Rapid Penang
 Rapid Kuantan
 Land Public Transport Agency (APAD)
 Public transport in Kuala Lumpur
 Buses in Kuala Lumpur
 List of bus routes in Kuala Lumpur
 Perbadanan Putrajaya
 Putrajaya Sentral

Notes
1.  P107 bus route began operation on 16 January 2023 until the MRT feeder buses T510 and T511 take over this bus route in 16 March 2023.

References

External links
 Official Nadi Putra website
 Perbadanan Putrajaya (PPJ)

1999 establishments in Malaysia
Transport in the Klang Valley
Transport in Kuala Lumpur
Bus transport in Malaysia
Bus companies of Malaysia
Transport in Putrajaya